The Toronto Mail was a newspaper in Toronto, Ontario which through corporate mergers became first The Mail and Empire, and then The Globe and Mail.

The Mail was founded in 1872 by Thomas Charles Patterson (b. 1836 in Patney, Wiltshire, England - died 1907 in Toronto). Patterson had been Postmaster of Toronto and was asked by the federal Conservative Party to become publisher of the newspaper. Patterson remained proprietor and editor until it changed hands with John Riordan (major creditor of the debts owed by The Mail) and Christopher William Bunting with the former assuming ownership.

Riordan died in 1884, but control of the paper when to his brother Charles Alfred Riordan in 1882 with Bunting remaining as director of the Mail.

It was the city's conservative paper until it declared itself independent of any political party in 1886. That prompted Prime Minister John A. Macdonald to found the Toronto Empire in 1887.  The Mail eventually returned to Conservative roots when it merged with the Toronto Empire to form The Mail and Empire in 1895. Bunting and Charles Riordan remained with the new paper, but Bunting died in 1896 and Riordan selling his stake in 1927 to Izaak Walton Killam.

The Mail and Empire merged in 1936 with The Globe to form The Globe and Mail.

Staff

 Kathleen Watkins Blake - journalist joined the paper in 1889
 Philip Dansken Ross - columnist
 Edmund Ernest Sheppard - columnist left in 1883 for Toronto Evening News
 Martin Joseph Griffin, editor 1881-1885
 Edward Farrer - writer 1872–1873, 1875-1881 and later editor 1884-1892

George R. Gregg, assistant editor

See also
 List of newspapers in Canada

References

See also
 Toronto Star

Newspapers published in Toronto
Publications established in 1872
Defunct newspapers published in Ontario
Publications disestablished in 1895
The Globe and Mail
1872 establishments in Ontario
1895 disestablishments in Ontario
Conservative media in Canada